Nectriopsis is a genus of fungi in the class Sordariomycetes. The number of species in this genus varies between sources. The Dictionary of Fungi lists 58 species but the Catalogue of Life includes 72 species.

Species
This species list includes 72 accepted species of Nectriopsis.

 Nectriopsis albida 
 Nectriopsis albofulta 
 Nectriopsis anthostomellicola 
 Nectriopsis apiosporae 
 Nectriopsis broomeana 
 Nectriopsis byssotecta 
 Nectriopsis candicans 
 Nectriopsis cariosae 
 Nectriopsis cladoniicola 
 Nectriopsis collematis 
 Nectriopsis cordiae 
 Nectriopsis cupulata 
 Nectriopsis curtiseta 
 Nectriopsis discicola 
 Nectriopsis discophila 
 Nectriopsis epimyces 
 Nectriopsis epimycota 
 Nectriopsis epinectria 
 Nectriopsis exigua 
 Nectriopsis flavella 
 Nectriopsis frangospora 
 Nectriopsis fuliginicola 
 Nectriopsis gangwondoensis 
 Nectriopsis guamuesii 
 Nectriopsis hainanensis 
 Nectriopsis heterodermiae 
 Nectriopsis hirsuta 
 Nectriopsis hirta 
 Nectriopsis hongkongensis 
 Nectriopsis hyperbiota 
 Nectriopsis hypocrellicola 
 Nectriopsis indigens 
 Nectriopsis infusaria 
 Nectriopsis lasioderma 
 Nectriopsis lasiodermopsis 
 Nectriopsis lecanodes 
 Nectriopsis leptogii 
 Nectriopsis lichenophila 
 Nectriopsis lilliputia 
 Nectriopsis lindauiana 
 Nectriopsis macroephichloe 
 Nectriopsis melongenoidea 
 Nectriopsis micareae 
 Nectriopsis microthecia 
 Nectriopsis mindoensis 
 Nectriopsis nanocarpa 
 Nectriopsis oropensoides 
 Nectriopsis ostiolorum 
 Nectriopsis oxyspora 
 Nectriopsis perpusilla 
 Nectriopsis peruvianus 
 Nectriopsis physciicola 
 Nectriopsis porinicola 
 Nectriopsis puiggarii 
 Nectriopsis queletii 
 Nectriopsis rexiana 
 Nectriopsis rubefaciens 
 Nectriopsis sasae 
 Nectriopsis septofusidiae 
 Nectriopsis sepultariae 
 Nectriopsis sibicola 
 Nectriopsis silvaustralis 
 Nectriopsis sororicola 
 Nectriopsis sporangiicola 
 Nectriopsis squamulosa 
 Nectriopsis tatrensis 
 Nectriopsis tremellicola 
 Nectriopsis uredinophila 
 Nectriopsis verseghyklarae 
 Nectriopsis vinosa 
 Nectriopsis violacea 
 Nectriopsis vivida

References

External links

Sordariomycetes genera
Bionectriaceae